Furanocoumarin 8-methyltransferase may refer to:

 8-hydroxyfuranocoumarin 8-O-methyltransferase
 Nicotinate N-methyltransferase